Narjeh Rural District is a rural district (dehestan) in the Central District of Takestan County, Qazvin Province, Iran. At the 2006 census, its population was 923, in 254 families.  The rural district has 16 villages.

References 

Rural Districts of Qazvin Province
Takestan County